CFMG-FM (104.9 MHz) is a Canadian radio station, broadcasting from Edmonton, Alberta. Branded as 104.9 Virgin Radio, the station airs a Top 40/CHR format. The station also broadcasts a Punjabi format on a Subsidiary Communications Multiplex Operation frequency.

History

Early years and EZ Rock
The station launched in 1978 playing "oldies" from offices and studios just north of Edmonton in St. Albert. The original frequency was 1070 kHz with the callsign CKST.

In 1988, CKST received approval to move from to 1200 AM and changed callsigns to CHMG the same year. CHMG received approval move from AM to FM in 1994.

In 1995, CHMG changed to its current callsign, CFMG-FM. At the same time, the station shifted to an adult contemporary format, branded as 104.9 EZ Rock. Programmed by longtime broadcaster Tammy Cole, "EZ Rock" was a station designed to appeal to office work environments. Music was slanted towards female listeners 25–54 years old.

On September 28, 2007, the CRTC approved the sale of CFMG and all Standard Radio assets to Astral Media.

Astral changed the logo of the station in September 2010; however, the adult contemporary format is unchanged while continuing to say the decimal point on the station ID. In addition, most of the classic hits were dropped.

Virgin Radio (2011-present)

On February 4, 2011, CFMG flipped to Top 40/CHR as 104.9 Virgin Radio. The last song on "EZ Rock" was "The Boys Of Summer' by Don Henley, while the first song on "Virgin" was "Firework" by Katy Perry. This left Edmonton with no adult contemporary station for 51 days until CKEA-FM dropped adult album alternative for AC (which has since shifted to adult hits).

CFMG, during its final adult contemporary week, did list its CHR adds on Mediabase's Canadian adult contemporary panel. A week after the station flipped formats, the station was delisted from Mediabase's station adds. As of March 2011, CFMG joined CHBN-FM on the Mediabase CHR panel.

CFMG is the third "Virgin" station in Canada to have a mainstream Top 40 format, the first being at Calgary's CIBK-FM the year before, and in Toronto at CKFM-FM in 2009.

Every year for one week, along with sister stations CFBR-FM and CFRN, CFMG presents, Stollery Week, a week long fundraiser for the Stollery Children's Hospital. In past years all three stations had broadcast live for 2 days from the Stollery Children's Hospital. In year one, $300,000 was raised for the Pediatric Oncology Unit; in year two, EZ Rock and her sister stations raised $500,000 for Research.

Ratings
The last ratings period when CFMG was an adult contemporary station (October/10 - January/11) placed the station at #4 with a 7.4 share. In the first ratings period as "Virgin" (February - May/11), the station plummeted to #14 and with a 2.6 share. The Fall 2011 BBM Canada ratings book has the station up to #11 with a 4.9 share.

As of February 28, 2021, CFMG is the 15th-most-listened-to radio station in the Edmonton market according to a PPM data report released by Numeris.

References

External links
104.9 Virgin Radio
 

Fmg
Fmg
Fmg
Virgin Radio
Radio stations established in 1978
1978 establishments in Alberta